The Union for the Defense of Tradesmen and Artisans (French: Union de défense des commerçants et artisans) was a French political movement from 1953 to 1962.

History
The Union for the Defense of Tradesmen and Artisans was founded in 1953 by Pierre Poujade. It published a newspaper, Fraternité française. It also had a hymn, written by André Montagard in 1955.

Poujade recruited up to 800,000 members. In 1956, 2.5 million French people voted for them, electing 42 new members of the National Assembly. In the assembly, they were called the Union et fraternité françaises.

The movement initially promoted the repeal of taxes for small business owners. By 1958, they were strongly opposed to Charles de Gaulle's policy of decolonisation in French Algeria.

The Union dissolved in 1962, due to infighting.

References

1953 establishments in France
1962 disestablishments in France
Taxation in France
Right-wing populism in France